Trang, also called Mueang Thap Thiang, is one of the southern provinces (changwat) of Thailand, on the west side of the Malay Peninsula facing the Strait of Malacca. Neighboring provinces are (from north clockwise) Krabi, Nakhon Si Thammarat, Phatthalung, and Satun.

Trang was formerly a port involved in foreign trade. It was the first place where rubber was planted in Thailand. Phraya Ratsadanupradit Mahison Phakdi brought rubber saplings from Malaya and planted them here in 1899, and rubber is now an important export of the country. The Trang River flows through the province from its origin in the Khao Luang mountain range, and the Palian River flows from the Banthat mountains. The province of Trang has an area of approximately 5,000 square km and 199 km of Strait of Malacca shoreline.

Geography
The province is on the coast of the Strait of Malacca, and contains 46 islands together with the mainland area. There are only few plains, and most of the area is hills. The Khao Luang and the Banthat mountain range are the sources of the two main rivers of the province, the Trang River and the Palian River.

The southern coast of the province is protected in the Mu Ko Phetra National Park. The estuary of the Trang River together with the Hat Chao Mai Marine National Park and Ko Libong Non-hunting Area are also registered Ramsar wetlands.

National parks
There are a total of three national parks, two ofwhich, along with eighteen other national parks, make up region 5 (Nakhon Si Thammarat) and Khao Pu–Khao Ya is in region 6 (Songkhla) of Thailand's protected areas.
 Khao Pu–Khao Ya National Park, 
 Mu Ko Phetra National Park, 
 Hat Chao Mai National Park,

History
Trang was an important seaport in southern Thailand. Legend says that ships always arrived in the morning, which led to the town's name. "Trang" derives from the Malay word for light or dawn (terang). But in another explanation it says that it comes from Sanskrit (tarangque) which means wave or gallop. In addition, the landscape of Trang is characterized by mounds interspersed with plains that look like waves. Thus, the provincial seal features sea waves and a lighthouse bridge.

The province was once a part of the Srivijaya empire, an ancient Hindu-Buddhist Melayu Kingdom and the Malay Sultanate of Kedah until 1810.

According to cultural records Trang was one of 12 satellite towns that existed about 900 years ago, but it was during the reign of King Rama II in 1811 that Trang got its first governor. The first Westerner to arrive in Trang was Captain James Low, who came in 1824 to negotiate commercial benefits.

The original town was in Khuanthani (now a tambon in district Kantang). In 1893, the governor, Phraya Ratsadanupradit Mahison Phakdi, also known as Khaw Sim Bee na Ranong, decided to make Trang an important seaport and relocated the town to Kantang District on the Trang River delta. It was moved again to its present location 26 km inland in 1916 by King Rama VI because of repeated flooding.

Trang was the first area of Thailand where rubber trees were planted, brought there by governor Phraya Ratsadanupradit Mahison Phakdi from British Malaya in 1899.

Symbols
The seal of the province shows a lighthouse bridge above a sea of waves. The lighthouse bridge refers to Trang as a seaport trading with foreign countries.

The provincial symbolic flower and tree is the green ebony (Jacaranda filicifolia). The plant was imported from Australia by the same governor who imported the rubber tree, and it quickly got the name "si trang" by the citizens.

Lambchop rasbora (Trigonostigma espei) is a provincial fish.

The provincial slogan เมืองพระยารัษฏา ชาวประชาใจกว้าง ถิ่นกำเนิดยางพารา เด่นสง่าดอกศรีตรัง ปะการังใต้ทะเล เสน่ห์หาดทรายงาม น้ำตกสวยตระการตา translates as "Phraya Rasda's town, generous people, delicious roast pork, the first city where para rubber was planted, the Si Trang provincial flower, underwater coral reefs, scenic beaches and waterfalls."

Administrative divisions

Provincial government
Trang is divided into 10 districts (amphoes). These are further divided into 87 subdistricts (tambons) and 697 villages (mubans).

Local government
As of 26 November 2019 there are: one Trang Provincial Administration Organisation and 22 municipal (thesaban) areas in the province. Trang has city (thesaban nakhon) status and Kantang has town (thesaban mueang) status. Further 20 subdistrict municipalities (thesaban tambon). The non-municipal areas are administered by 77 Subdistrict Administrative Organisations - SAO (ongkan borihan suan tambon).

Transportation 
Air: Trang Airport is 7 km from Trang town centre. It is served by Thailand AirAsia and Nok Air, with flights to Bangkok.
 
Rail: Trang is one of the southern destinations offering trains to Bangkok railway station. Starting from Thung Song Junction railway station in Nakhon Si Thammarat province, this southwestern route has three stations: Huai Yot railway station at Huai Yot District, Trang railway station and ends at Kantang railway station at Kantang railway station.
   
Road: Major roads to and from Trang are:
Highway 4 (Bangkok—Chumphon) via Highway 41 (Surat Thani—Thung Song—Huai Yot—Trang), a distance of 828 kilometres.
Highway 4 (Bangkok—Chumphon) via Ranong—Phang Nga—Krabi—Trang, a distance of 1,020 kilometres.
Highway 404-416 (Satun—Palian—Trang), 140 kilometres.
Highway 4-407 (Hat Yai—Phatthalung—Trang), 148 kilometres.
Highway 4-402 (Phuket—Phang Nga—Krabi—Trang), 312 kilometres.

Bus:There are buses to and from Trang to Bangkok and main provinces (Phuket, Hat Yai, Krabi, Nakhon Si Thammarat, and Satun).

Boats to islands: Trang has four piers for boats to the islands: Pak Meng Pier, Ban Chao Mai Pier, Klong Son Pier, and Kuan Thung Kuu Pier.

Education 
Secondary schools:
 Wichienmatu School  วิเชียรมาตุ
 Wichienmatu 2 School  วิเชียรมาตุ 2
 Wichienmatu 3 School  วิเชียรมาตุ 3
 Saparachinee School  สภาราชินี
 Saparachinee 2 School  สภาราชินี 2
 จุฬาภรณ์ราชวิทยาลัย
 Sport School โรงเรียนกีฬาตรัง
 Buranarumluk School  บูรณะรำลึก
 Panyawit School ปัญญาวิทย์
 Darunothai School  ดรุโณทัย
 Trang vittaya School  ตรังวิทยา
 Trangchristiensuksa  ตรังคริสเตียนศึกษา
Wat Kaphang Surin School โรงเรียนวัดกระพังสุรินทร์
Pornsirikul School พรศิริกุล
 Matayomsuksa Watkuanwisetmulaniti School มัธยมศึกษาวัดควนวิเศษ มูลนิธิ
 Kantangpittayakorn School  กันตังพิทยากร
 Kantangratsadasuksa School  กันตังรัษฎาศึกษา
 Yantakhao Ratchanupatham School ย่านตาขาวรัฐชนูปถัมภ์
 Palean padungsit School  ปะเหลียนผดุงศิษย์
 Kantapittayakarn School  คันธพิทยาคาร
 Sikao prachapadungvit School  สิเกาประชาผดุงวิทย์
 Wangviset School  วังวิเศษ
 Huayyot School  ห้วยยอด
 Lampurareungvit School  ลำภูราเรืองวิทย์
 Nampud School  น้ำผุด
 Ratsada School  รัษฎา
 Huaynang ratsadornbamrung School  ห้วยนางราษฎรบำรุง
 Ratsadanupradit anusorn School  รัษฎานุประดิษย์อนุสรณ์
 Nayong vittayakom School  นาโยงวิทยาคม
 Sawatratanapimuk School  สวัสดิ์รัตนาภิมุข
 Thungnonghang prachason School  ทุ่งหนองแห้งประชาสรรค์
 Hatsumran vittayakom School  หาดสำราญวิทยาคม
 Trang polytechnic School ตรังโปลีเทคนิค

Higher education:
 Rajamangala University of Technology Srivijaya (Trang campus)
 Prince of Songkla University (Trang campus)
 Ramkhamhaeng University (Trang campus)
 Suan Dusit Rajabhat University (Trang center)
 Boromrajonane College of Nursing
 Sirindhorn College of Public Health
 Trang Technical College
 Trang College of Agricultural and Technology
 Trang Polytechnic College
 Siam Commercial College

Healthcare 
Trang Hospital (main hospital, public)
Watanapat Hospital (private)
Trang Ruampat Hospital (private)

Human achievement index 2017

Since 2003, United Nations Development Programme (UNDP) in Thailand has tracked progress on human development at sub-national level using the Human achievement index (HAI), a composite index covering all the eight key areas of human development. National Economic and Social Development Board (NESDB) has taken over this task since 2017.

Events and festivals
Trang Vegetarian Festival (เทศกาลกินเจ): since Trang has a large population of Thai-Chinese, therefore causing the Vegetarian Festival in October annually alike to Phuket. People become vegetarian and dress in white for nine days and nights. This should bring them good fortune. Trang is one of the provinces that hold this festival superbly.
Trang Underwater Wedding Ceremony (พิธีวิวาห์ใต้สมุทร): is a wedding ceremony under the sea of Trang. It was first held in early 1996, and ever since, it has been continuously held every year during the Valentine's Festival. This ceremony is promoted by the Tourism Authority of Thailand (TAT).
Marine Pulling Buddha Procession (ชักพระทางทะเล): or Chak Phra in Thai is a Buddhist festival that is generally performed in many provinces of the southern such as Surat Thani. Chakra Phra is to invite Buddha image into a boat and paddle to various places on the water for prosperity. But Trang is the only province that holds this festival by sea. Chak Phra is held annually after the end of Buddhist Lent (during October).

Local food
Trang is another province rich with famous local food even receiving the nickname "The Land of Food" for example
Mu yang (หมูย่าง), also known as Mu han (หมูหัน): a barbecue roasted piglet with crispy skin, regarded as a menu that has been influenced by Cantonese cuisine for over 100 years.
Dim sum: Trang regarded as a province where has a unique breakfast cuisine found nowhere else in Thailand. There are many coffee shops in the form of Kopi tiam (traditional coffee shop) that served in a variety of menus such as  Pathongko (Youtiao), Khanom jeeb (Shumai), Har gow (white shrimp dumpling), Salapao (Siopao), Popia thot (deep fried spring roll) include Mu yang.
Trang cake, also known as Kook Ming cake: a traditional cake that originated in Lamphu Ra, 14 km north of Mueang Trang. These cakes were cooked by an authentic process by baking in the charcoal oven and have no frosting with have several flavours like orange, coffee, pandan, three-flavoured etc.

Gallery

References

External links

Provincial website

 
Provinces of Thailand
Southern Thailand
Strait of Malacca